Sulaimon Bolaji Adekunle (born 26 October 1990, in Ibadan) is a Nigerian footballer who currently plays for Bylis Ballsh in the Albanian Superliga.

References

External links

1990 births
Living people
Nigerian footballers
KF Apolonia Fier players
Kategoria Superiore players
Nigerian expatriates in Albania
Expatriate footballers in Albania
Yoruba sportspeople
Association football defenders
Sportspeople from Ibadan